The Coupe du Congo (in English: Cup of Congo) is the national cup basketball championship in the Democratic Republic of the Congo. The competitions is played by the top two teams from the regional league in the country. It is the only annual competition organised by the Democratic Republic of Congo Basketball Federation (FEBACO). The cup is organised since 1985.

In 2022, 17 men's team and 8 women's team competed. The teams are divided in two groups for the first stage, the top four teams advance to the semifinals.

Men's champions

Performance by club

Women's champions

References 

Basketball in the Democratic Republic of the Congo